Ganaveh Kan (also Romanized as Ganāveh Kān; also known as Genāvākān, Genāvkān, and Kenāveh Kān) is a village in Darvahi Rural District, Ab Pakhsh District, Dashtestan County, Bushehr Province, Iran. At the 2006 census, its population was 57, in 11 families.

References 

Populated places in Dashtestan County